FC Smena Komsomolsk-na-Amure is a Russian football club from Komsomolsk-on-Amur, founded in 1935. It played in the Russian Professional Football League. It played professionally in 1946, 1957–1970, 1978–1994 and from 2002 to 2018. It reached the second-highest level (Soviet First League and Russian First Division) in 1957–1962 and 1992.

They won their Russian Professional Football League zone East in the 2015–16 season, but did not participate in the second-tier 2016–17 Russian Football National League as they don't have necessary financing.
Their main source of income is Khabarovsk Krai which already finances another FNL team FC SKA-Energiya Khabarovsk and doesn't have necessary expenses budgeted for a second FNL team.

Before the 2018–19 season, the league proposed splitting the East zone of the PFL into two new zones - Siberia and Far East, as it was difficult for teams based in Siberia to afford travel to Far East. However, the largest number of teams that would be potentially ready to compete in the new proposed Far East zone was 4, which was not sustainable for the full season. Smena was forced to drop out of the professional competition to the amateur levels.

Team name history
 1935–1945 Stroitel
 1946–1956 Dynamo
 1957–1959 Lokomotiv
 1960–1977 Avangard
 1978–1999 Amur
 1999–2001 KnAAPO-Smena
 2002–present Smena

External links
Official website

References

Association football clubs established in 1935
Football clubs in Russia
Sport in Khabarovsk Krai
1935 establishments in Russia